The People's Progressive Party (PPP) was a political party in Anguilla.

History
The PPP was established in 1976 by Ronald Webster in order to contest the general elections that year.  The party won six of the seven seats in the House of Assembly, with Webster becoming the island's first Chief Minister.

However, in February 1977 the House passed a motion of no confidence on Webster by a vote of 5–2. As a result, Emile Gumbs of the Anguilla National Alliance was appointed Chief Minister.

By the 1980 elections Webster had established the Anguilla United Movement, which won six of the seven seats.

References

Defunct political parties in Anguilla
Political parties established in 1976
1976 establishments in Anguilla
Political parties with year of disestablishment missing